The Pushkov Institute of Terrestrial Magnetism, Ionosphere and Radiowave Propagation of the Russian Academy of Sciences (IZMIRAN) is a scientific institution of the Russian Academy of Sciences. this institute was founded in 1939 by Nikolay Pushkov.

Institute owns several space satellites programs:

 CORONAS - Complex ORbital Near Earth Solar Activities (experiment ended)
 COMPASS (Kompas) - Complex Orbital Magneto-Plasma Autonomous Small Satellite (see 2001 in spaceflight)
 Interheliozond
 Intercosmos-19 (Cosmos-1809) - research of the Earth ionospheric structure and of the electromagnetic processes in it (experiment ended)
 Prognoz - a series of magnetometer satellites
 APEX - Active Plasma Experiments

References

External links
 Official IZMIRAN website, Russian/English mixed content
 Solar-Terrestrial Physics Division of IZMIRAN
 Complex Orbital Magneto-Plasma Autonomous Small Satellite
 IZMIRAN Geophysical Situation Forecasting Center

1939 establishments in the Soviet Union
Earth science research institutes
Ionosphere
Institutes of the Russian Academy of Sciences
Research institutes in the Soviet Union
Troitsky Administrative Okrug
Troitsk Settlement
Research institutes established in 1939